Cephetola peteri is a butterfly in the family Lycaenidae. It is found in Kenya and north-western Tanzania.

References

Butterflies described in 1998
Poritiinae